Isaac I. Shalom (September 15, 1887 – July 24, 1968), was an American businessman, philanthropist, and one of the leaders of the Sephardi and Syrian Jewish communities in New York.

Life and career 
Isaac Shalom was born in Aleppo, Syria on September 15, 1887. In 1907 he emigrated to the United States and settled in New York′s Lower East Side. He started his career as a textile peddler and soon became a supplier to other Syrian Jewish immigrants. In 1921 he established the handkerchief firm of I. Shalom & Co., which developed into one of the leading manufacturers in its field in the United States.

Known as a philanthropist supporting Orthodox Jewish causes, particularly educational institutions, he helped found synagogues, a youth center and institutes of Jewish learning in the United States such as Magen David Yeshivah in New York, a private school which provides a secular and Jewish education to about 2,400 students from preschool to high school established in 1946. He was instrumental in 1945 in founding Ozar Hatorah, an organization that provides Orthodox Jewish education for Jewish children in the Muslim countries of North Africa and the Middle East and in France.

Shalom was an active Zionist who established enterprises in Israel and was one of the leaders of the Sephardi and Syrian communities in New York City.

Shalom lived in Brooklyn, New York. He died on July 24, 1968 and is buried on the Mount of Olives in East Jerusalem. He was married to Alice Shalom née Chabot. The couple had three sons and two daughters.

Criticism 
According to David Shasha of the advocacy group Center for Sephardic Heritage in Brooklyn, Shalom′s pedagogical approach led to the importation of a form of Ashkenazi Orthodoxy and leadership into the Brooklyn Sephardi community, tearing it forcibly away from its historical culture.

See also 
 Syrian Jewish communities of the United States

References

External links 
Website Ozar Hatorah

20th-century American businesspeople
American Sephardic Jews
American people of Syrian-Jewish descent
1886 births
1968 deaths
20th-century American philanthropists